Stefan Birčević (born December 13, 1989) is a Serbian professional basketball player for Cluj of the Romanian Liga Națională. He also represents the Serbian national basketball team.

Professional career
Birčević played with Metalac Valjevo, before joining Radnički Kragujevac in the summer of 2011. In August 2014, he moved to Spain and signed with CB Estudiantes. On 13 June 2016 he signed a two-year contract with Serbian club Partizan.

On 13 July 2017, Birčević signed with Turkish club İstanbul BŞB for the 2017–18 season.

On 4 December 2018, Birčević signed with German club Baskets Bonn for the rest of 2018–19 season.

On 23 August 2019, Birčević signed with Partizan for the rest of 2019–20 season.

On 16 December 2020, Birčević signed with Borac Čačak for the rest of 2020–21 season. He left the team 10 days later, prior his debut for Borac. On 28 December, he signed for the Hiroshima Dragonflies of the B.League. However, due to COVID-19 pandemic travel restrictions he never manage to join the Hiroshima Dragonflies and left the team prior his debut. 

In February 2021, Birčević signed for Turkish club Frutti Extra Bursaspor.

On July 13, 2021, he has signed with Cluj of the Romanian Liga Națională.

National team career

Birčević won the gold medal with the Serbian university team at the 2011 Summer Universiade in Shenzhen. Birčević was a member of the Serbian national basketball team that won the silver medal at the 2014 FIBA Basketball World Cup.

Birčević also represented Serbia at the 2016 Summer Olympics where they won the silver medal, after losing to the United States in the final game with 96–66.

Birčević also represented Serbia at the EuroBasket 2017 where they won the silver medal, after losing in the final game to Slovenia.

At the 2019 FIBA Basketball World Cup, the national team of Serbia was dubbed as favorite to win the trophy, but was eventually upset in the quarterfinals by Argentina. With wins over the United States and Czech Republic, it finished in fifth place. Birčević averaged 4.8 points and 2.8 rebounds over 6 tournament games.

See also
List of Olympic medalists in basketball

References

External links
Stefan Birčević at aba-liga.com
Stefan Birčević at eurobasket.com
Stefan Birčević at euroleague.net
Stefan Birčević at fiba.com

1989 births
Living people
2014 FIBA Basketball World Cup players
2019 FIBA Basketball World Cup players
ABA League players
Bandırma B.İ.K. players
Basketball League of Serbia players
Basketball players from Belgrade
Basketball players at the 2016 Summer Olympics
Bursaspor Basketbol players
CB Estudiantes players
CS Universitatea Cluj-Napoca (men's basketball) players
İstanbul Büyükşehir Belediyespor basketball players
KK Metalac Valjevo players
KK Partizan players
KK Radnički Kragujevac (2009–2014) players
Liga ACB players
Medalists at the 2011 Summer Universiade
Medalists at the 2016 Summer Olympics
Olympic basketball players of Serbia
Olympic medalists in basketball
Olympic silver medalists for Serbia
Power forwards (basketball)
Serbia men's national basketball team players
Serbian expatriate basketball people in Germany
Serbian expatriate basketball people in Spain
Serbian expatriate basketball people in Turkey
Serbian men's basketball players
Telekom Baskets Bonn players
Universiade gold medalists for Serbia
Universiade medalists in basketball